Nicasius was a Roman cognomen, whose variants include Nicasio, Nicaise, and Necaise. It can refer to:

Saints
Nicasius of Rheims (5th century)
Nicasius of Dijon (4th century)
Nicasius, Quirinus, Scubiculus, and Pientia (3rd century), martyrs
Nicasius of Sicily (Nicasio Burgio, Nicasius Martyr, Nicasius de Burgio) (died 1187), martyred Knight Hospitaller

Other
Nicasio, California, a census designated place in Marin County
Nicasius le Febure
Nycasius de Clibano
Nicasius Russell (died 1646), goldsmith to Anne of Denmark
Nicasio Silverio (born 1930), Cuban swimmer
Nicasius, first bishop of Rouen
Alberto Nicasio (1902–1980), Argentinian artist
Juan Nicasio (born 1986), Dominican baseball pitcher
Nicasius de Vries (born 1995), Dutch racing driver